Rostyslav Bahdasarov (24 May 1993 – 13 March 2021) was a Ukrainian footballer who played as a defender.

Career
Bahdasarov was a product of the Shakhtar Donetsk youth team. He was forced to retire at the age of 24 due to heart problems in 2017.

He died aged 27 on 13 March 2021.

References

External links

1993 births
2021 deaths
Ukrainian footballers
Association football defenders
Footballers from Donetsk
FC Shakhtar-3 Donetsk players
FC Kolos Kovalivka players
FC Stal Kamianske players
Ukrainian Premier League players
Ukrainian First League players
Ukrainian Second League players
21st-century Ukrainian people